This is a list of urban agglomerations and cities (those not included in the Urban Agglomerations), with a population above 100,000 as per 2011 census in the Indian state of Jharkhand:

Urban agglomeration
In the census of India 2011, an urban agglomeration has been defined as follows:

"An urban agglomeration is a continuous urban spread constituting a town and its adjoining outgrowths (OGs), or two or more physically contiguous towns together with or without outgrowths of such towns. An Urban Agglomeration must consist of at least a statutory town and its total population (i.e. all the constituents put together) should not be less than 20,000 as per the 2001 Census. In varying local conditions, there were similar other combinations which have been treated as urban agglomerations satisfying the basic condition of contiguity."

Constituents of urban agglomerations in Jharkhand
The constituents of urban agglomerations in Jharkhand, with a population of 1 lakh or above, are noted below:

 Jamshedpur Urban Agglomeration includes: * Jamshedpur (Industrial Town), Jamshedpur (NAC), Tata Nagar Railway Colony (OG), Mango (NAC),  Jugsalai (M), Bagbera (CT), Chhota Gobindpur (CT), Haludbani (CT), Sarjamda (CT), Gadhra (CT), Ghorabandha (CT), Purihasa (CT), Adityapur (M Corp.), Chota Gamahria (CT) and Kapali (CT). 
 Dhanbad Urban Agglomeration includes: Dhanbad (M Corp.), Pondarkanali (CT), Malkera (CT), Baua Kalan (CT) and Nagri Kalan (CT).
 Ranchi Urban Agglomeration includes: Ranchi (M Corp.), Kanke (CT), Arsande (CT), Ara (CT), Tundiul (CT) and Bargarwa (CT).
 Bokaro Steel City Urban Agglomeration includes:  Bokaro Steel City (CT), Chas (M Corp.), Bandhgora (CT) and Kamaldih (CT).
 Phusro Urban Agglomeration includes:  Phusro (M corp), Bermo (CT), Jaridih Bazar (CT), Bokaro Thermal (CT) and Kurpania (CT).
 Hazaribagh Urban Agglomeration includes Hazaribagh (M Corp.) and Okni (CT). 
 Giridih Urban Agglomeration includes: Giridih (M Corp.), Paratdih (CT), Sirsia (CT), Pertodih (CT) and Dandidih (CT). 
 Ramgarh Urban Agglomeration includes: Ramgarh (NP), Sirka (CT), Marar (CT) and Barkakana (CT). 
 Medininagar(Daltonganj) Urban Agglomeration includes:  Medininagar (Daltonganj) (M Corp.), Rerma (CT), Sundna (CT), Baratola (CT), Nimiya (CT), Bajraha (CT), Bairiya (CT), Redma (CT) ward 0001, Sudna (CT) ward 0001, Baralota (CT) ward 0001.
 Chirkunda Urban Agglomeration includes: Chirkunda (NP), Egarkunr (CT), Siuliban (CT), Mera (CT), Maithon (CT) and Dumarkunda (CT).

Abbreviations: M Corp. = Municipal corporation,   M = Municipal Council, NP = Nagar Parishad, NAC = Notified area committee, CT = Census town, CB = Cantonment Board, OG= Out Growth

Urban agglomeration constituents
Urban agglomerations constituents with a population above 100,000 as per 2011 census are shown in the table below.

References

Cities by population
Jharkhand